Notoryctidae is a family of mammals, allying several extant and fossil species of Australia.

The group appear to have diverged from other marsupials at an early stage and are highly specialised to foraging through loose sand; the unusual features have seen the unique family placed in the taxonomic order Notoryctemorphia Aplin & Archer, 1987. The eyes and external ears are absent in the modern species, the nose is shielded and mouth reduced in size, and they use pairs of well developed claws to move beneath the sand. The Australian animals resemble a species known as moles, a burrow building mammal found in other continents, and were collectively referred to as 'marsupial moles'. The regional names for the well known animals, established before their published descriptions, are used to refer to the species.

The extant notoryctid species are subterranean, and are extremely well adapted to moving through sand plains and dunes, these are the two species of genus Notoryctes Stirling, 1891. The animals are known as itjaritjari, species N. typhlops, and kakarratul, a name for species N. caurinus.

A fossil species in a new genus was published as Naraboryctes Archer et al. 2010. A new diagnosis for Notoryctidae was also provided in the species first description, as a consequence of the discovery a fossil species of the family.

The dental formula is I1-5/1-3, C1/1, P1-3/1-3, M1-4/1-4.

References

 
Taxa named by James Douglas Ogilby
Mammal families